Gleimia hominis is a bacterium from the genus of Gleimia which has been isolated from a wound swab.

References

Actinomycetales
Bacteria described in 2010